TLA Releasing is a US film distribution and production company owned by TLA Entertainment Group. In March 2011, a new LLC was formed for the operation. Its primary output is LGBT-related films from all over the world under the "TLA Releasing" label, as well as horror films under the label "Danger After Dark". Since 2000, they have released over 200 films on DVD and various VOD platforms.

In 2005, they opened a branch in the UK. In June 2011, they announced "TLA Select", a line of Blu-rays of TLA Releasing's the most popular films, including Latter Days, Another Gay Movie and Another Gay Sequel, Make the Yuletide Gay, and Boy Culture.

In July 2011, the UK division lost its entire inventory of DVDs when rioters in London burnt down a Sony warehouse. Sony rapidly worked to replenish the lost stock.

Select films released through TLA Releasing

 29th and Gay
 800 Balas
 Absolut Warhola
 Adam & Steve
 A Little Lust (Italy, "Né Romeo, Né Giulietta")
 Another Gay Movie
 Another Gay Sequel: Gays Gone Wild!
 Bear City
 Bear City 2 - The Proposal
 Beautiful Boxer
 Blackmail Boys
 Bloomington (UK)
 Blue and Not So Pink (Venezuela)
 Boy Culture
 Boys in the Sand
 Cachorro
 Children of God
 Circuit
 Conspiracy of Silence
 David's Birthday (UK)
 Death of a Dynasty
 Down in Paris (USA & UK) 
 Dog Tags
 Dorian Blues
 Edge of Seventeen
 Eighteen
 Ethan Mao
 Far Side of the Moon
 Finding Me
 Finding Me: Truth
 Five Dances
 The Fluffer
 From Beginning to End
 Fruit Fly
 Godforsaken
 Gone But Not Forgotten
 La Primera Noche
 Latter Days
 Leo's Room (UK)
 Locked Up 
 Luster
 Make the Yuletide Gay
 Metrosexuality
 Mom + Mom
 Mysterious Skin
 Naked Boys Singing
 Naked Fame
 O Homem Que Copiava
 Old Men in New Cars
 One Kiss (Italy, "Un Bacio")
 P.S. Your Cat Is Dead
 Pervert!
 Say Uncle
 Shiner
 Sleeper Cell (Series 1, Region 2 only)
 Soundless Wind Chime
 Speechless (2012)
 Straight-Jacket
 The Stranger in Us (UK)
 Stratosphere Girl
 Street Bangaz
 Surrender Dorothy
 Three Dancing Slaves (Le Clan)
 Under One Roof
 Waiting for the Messiah
 The Wedding Video
 When Boys Fly
 The Wooden Camera
 Wrangler: Anatomy of an Icon
 You Are Not Alone
 Zerophilia

Danger After Dark films

2LDK (2003)
Dante's Inferno (USA, 2007)
Epitaph (South Korea, 2007)
Evilenko (Italy, 2005)
Feed (Australia, 2005)
Gutterballs (Canada, 2008)
Hell's Ground (Zibahkhana) (Pakistan, 2007)
The Living and the Dead (UK, 2006)
Meatball Machine (Japan, 2005)
Moon Child (Gackt) (Japan, 2003)
Next Door (Naboer) (Norway, 2005)
Satan Hates You (USA, 2010)
Storm (Sweden, 2005)
Strange Circus (Japan, 2005)
Suicide Club (Japan, 2002)
Summer Scars (USA, 2007)
Danger After Dark Collection (Japan, 2002)
Evil (To Kako) (Greece, 2005)
Pistoleros (Denmark, 2006)
Rapturious (USA, 2007)
The Wedding Party (Belgium, 2005)

References

External links
 

Culture of Philadelphia
Film distributors of the United States
LGBT arts organizations
LGBT-related film